Farrash Kola-ye Olya (also Romanized as Farrāsh Kolā-ye ‘Olyā; also known as Farrāsh Kolā and Farrāsh Kolā-ye Bālā) is a village in Kalej Rural District, in the Central District of Nowshahr County, Mazandaran Province, Iran. At the 2006 census, its population was 407, in 111 families.

References 

Populated places in Nowshahr County